Caitiff (literally a despicable coward or wretch) may mean:

 a galley-slave in a Barbary bagnio
 a Camarilla clanless character in Vampire: The Masquerade
 The Caitiff Choir, an album released by the band It Dies Today